Cumberland is a train station in Cumberland, Maryland, United States served by Amtrak, the national railroad passenger system. It is also served by the Bayrunner Shuttle bus, which runs between Grantsville and BWI Airport. The station has one side platform serving the two tracks of the Cumberland Terminal Subdivision.

Amtrak, the national passenger rail system, provides intercity service to Cumberland under the Capitol Limited route which runs between Chicago and Washington, D.C.

History

The current waiting shelter for Amtrak service in Cumberland sits on the original site of the Queen City Station. This was a 174-room hotel constructed by the Baltimore & Ohio Railroad in 1871 with a ballroom, a 400-seat dining room, and gardens and fountains. The station was demolished in 1972, an act which spurred conservation efforts for architecturally and historically significant structures.

References

External links

Cumberland Amtrak Station (USA RailGuide -- TrainWeb)
Bayrunner Shuttle

Amtrak stations in Maryland
Transportation in Cumberland, MD-WV-PA